Aeronca, contracted from Aeronautical Corporation of America, located in Middletown, Ohio, is a US manufacturer of engine components and airframe structures for commercial aviation and the defense industry, and a former aircraft manufacturer.  From 1928 to 1951, the company was a major producer of general aviation aircraft, and also produced the engines for some of their early designs.

Aeronca is now (2011) a division of Magellan Aerospace, producing aircraft, missile, and space vehicle components at the same location adjacent to Middletown's Hook Field Municipal Airport.

History

Origins
The Aeronca Aircraft Corporation was founded November 11, 1928, in Cincinnati, Ohio. Backed by the financial and political support of the prominent Taft family and future Ohio senator Robert A. Taft who was one of the firm's directors, Aeronca became the first company to build a commercially successful general aviation aircraft. When production ended in 1951, Aeronca had sold 17,408 aircraft in 55 models.

Production began with the Jean A. Roche-designed Aeronca C-2 monoplane, often called the "Flying Bathtub", in 1929. The next major model was the Scout of 1937, a two-seater, which was developed into the Chief and Super Chief the next year.

The Ohio River flood of 1937 at the Lunken Airport resulted in the entire airport area being washed away. Aeronca's factory was destroyed, along with the tooling and almost all of the very early blueprints and drawings. As a result, two years later the decision was made to move out of the floodplain to Hook Field Municipal Airport in Middletown, Ohio.

World War II
The Defender, a tandem trainer version of the Chief with a higher rear seat, was used in training many of the pilots who flew in World War II.

Several observation and liaison aircraft designs were also produced during and after the war, seeing extensive front line use, including the L-3/O-58.

A glider-trainer version of the Defender, the Aeronca TG-5, replaced the engine with a third seat, facilitating the training of combat glider pilots destined to fly larger craft, such as the Waco CG-4A.

Aeronca's World War II designs—the Defender, TG-5 and L-3 variants—differed significantly from nearly all previous and subsequent Aeroncas by replacing Aeronca's traditional three-longeron, triangular-cross-section fuselage with a four-longeron, rectangular-cross-section fuselage for additional strength.

Postwar

In 1945, following the end of World War II, Aeronca returned to civilian production with two new models, the 7AC Champion and the 11AC Chief.  While the Champ shared its tandem seating arrangement with the prewar tandem trainer—and the Chief shared its name and seating arrangement with the prewar Chief designs—both were new fresh paper designs and designed for production economy, sharing over 80% of the components.  One of the very few aircraft manufacturers that used an assembly line production layout.<ref name="pirep">Karant, Max, "Flying Check Pilot: The Aeronca Chief ," 'Flying Magazine, Dec., 1946.</ref>Keyhoe, Donald E., Major, USAF (noted USAF test pilot), "Plane of the Month: The Aeronca Chief," TRUE: The Men's Magazine, Sep., 1946.

A benefit of the concurrent development was that the new designs had about 80% of their parts in common.  Nevertheless, the tandem-seat Champ—resembling the extremely popular Piper J-3 Cub—was favored by the market, evidenced by its outselling its sibling, the Chief, at a rate of 4 to 1. Between 1945 and 1951, nearly 8,000 Champions were manufactured; while over the same period, approximately 2,000 Chiefs were produced.

New ownership
Aeronca ceased light aircraft production in 1951, and in 1954 sold the Champion design to the new Champion Aircraft Corporation of Osceola, Wisconsin, which continued building variants of the Champion as well as the derivative design, the Citabria. The venerable aircraft design was acquired again by the Bellanca Aircraft Company in 1970 and again to American Champion in 1988, where it remains in production.

Aeronca purchased the Longren Aircraft Corporation in 1959. However, by 1965 it was nearly bankrupt and a new president, Alfred A. Handschumacher, was hired to return the company to profitability.

In the early 1970s, Aeronca was contracted by Bede Aircraft to assemble its first Bede BD-5J Microjet—the world's smallest jet airplane—but, after its experiences with the prototype, Aeronca declined to be further involved with the program.

In 1978 Aeronca planned to start aircraft production again with production of a prototype very light business jet, the Foxjet ST600. The project was eventually cancelled due to lack of WR-44 engine availability.

Fleet Aerospace launched a successful hostile takeover of the company in 1986.

Aeronca now builds components for aerospace companies including Boeing, Northrop Grumman, Lockheed and Airbus. In its 23-year history as a general aviation and military aviation manufacturer, Aeronca produced 17,408 aircraft spanning 55 different models.

 Products 
 Aircraft 

Missiles
 GT-1 (missile)

Engines
 Aeronca E-107
 Aeronca E-113

See also
 Aeronca Museum
 International Aircraft
 Metal Aircraft Corporation
 Taylorcraft Aircraft

References

Notes

Bibliography

 "Aeronautical Corporation of America (Aeronca)" by Roger Guillemette, US Centennial of Flight Commission'', retrieved 20 January 2006.

External links

Aeronca Aviators Club, started by Joe Dickey. Has Quarterly Newsletter
National Aeronca Association, associated with the original Aeronca factory.
Aeronca Aircraft History Museum, Director Todd Trainor, supporting various models of the aircraft.
Aeronca Club of Germany
Aeronca Club of Great Britain
Fearless Aeronca Aviators, a very popular Aeronca email list.

Aviation in Ohio
Manufacturing companies established in 1928
Companies based in Ohio
Aircraft manufacturers of the United States
Aircraft engine manufacturers of the United States
Middletown, Ohio
1928 establishments in Ohio